This is a list of fellows of the Royal Society elected in 1684.

Fellows 
James Monson  (1660–1688)
Thomas Baker  (1625?–1690)
Richard Beaumont  (1654–1692)
Nicolas Fremont d’Ablancourt  (1621–1696)
Henry Hyde 2nd Earl of Clarendon (1638–1709)
William Musgrave  (1655–1721)
Alexander Pitfeild  (1658–1728)
Tancred Robinson  (c.1658–1748)
Benjamin von Munchausen  (b. 1684)

References

1684
1684 in science
1684 in England